Caeruleuptychia is a genus of satyrid butterfly found in the Neotropical realm.

Species
Listed alphabetically:
Caeruleuptychia aegrota (Butler, 1867)
Caeruleuptychia brixius (Godart, [1824])
Caeruleuptychia caerulea (Butler, 1869)
Caeruleuptychia coelestis (Butler, 1867)
Caeruleuptychia coelica (Hewitson, 1869)
Caeruleuptychia cyanites (Butler, 1871)
Caeruleuptychia divina (Weymer, 1911)
Caeruleuptychia glauca (Weymer, 1911)
Caeruleuptychia helena (Anken, 1994)
Caeruleuptychia helios (Weymer, 1911)
Caeruleuptychia lobelia (Butler, 1870)
Caeruleuptychia mare (Butler, 1869)
Caeruleuptychia penicillata (Godman, 1905)
Caeruleuptychia pilata (Butler, 1867)
Caeruleuptychia scopulata (Godman, 1905)
Caeruleuptychia tenera (Weymer, 1911)
Caeruleuptychia twalela Brévignon, 2005
Caeruleuptychia umbrosa (Butler, 1870)
Caeruleuptychia urania (Butler, 1867)
Caeruleuptychia ziza (Butler, 1869)

References

Euptychiina
Butterfly genera
Taxa named by Walter Forster (entomologist)